Mediusella bernieri is a plant in the family Sarcolaenaceae. It is endemic to Madagascar.

Description
The plant's flowers are usually in inflorescences of two or three flowers, each with white to yellow petals. Mediusella bernieri flowers and fruits from February to July.

Distribution and habitat
Mediusella bernieri is only found in the far northern regions of Diana and Sava (the former Antsiranana Province). Its habitat is dry forests, on various rocky formations, from  altitude.

Threats
Mediusella bernieri is in decline due to habitat destruction from activities such as agriculture, mining, fires and wood harvesting. In 2019, it was assessed by the IUCN as Endangered. Although four (of nine) subpopulations of the species are within the protected areas of Andavakoeira-Andrafiamena and Loky Manambato, the species' decline continues due to the above activities.

References

Sarcolaenaceae
Endemic flora of Madagascar
Plants described in 1886
Taxa named by Henri Ernest Baillon
Taxa named by John Hutchinson (botanist)
Flora of the Madagascar dry deciduous forests